Events in the year 1968 in Cyprus.

Incumbents 

 President: Makarios III
 President of the Parliament: Glafcos Clerides

Events 

 25 February – Incumbent President Makarios III won the presidential elections with 96.3% of the vote. Voter turnout was 93.5%.

Deaths

References 

 
1960s in Cyprus
Years of the 21st century in Cyprus
Cyprus
Cyprus
Cyprus